Chestnut Mound is an unincorporated community in Smith County, United States. Its ZIP code is 38552.

Climate
Chestnut Mound's climate is four-season subtropical (Cfa) under Köppen (oceanic Do under Trewartha, but nearly Cf), typical of Tennessee. Chestnut Mound lies in USDA Hardiness Zone 7a, so the coldest night of the year typically drops to 0 to 5 degrees Fahrenheit (-18 to -15 degrees Celsius).

Notes

Unincorporated communities in Smith County, Tennessee
Unincorporated communities in Tennessee